Vlastislav Mareček (15 April 1966 – 2 September 2007) was a Czech football coach. He was voted the best club coach of the Czech Republic in 2004/05 and 2005/06 seasons. During his career, he served as a coach of the junior national team, as well as of numerous Czech football clubs. In 2004-2006, he served as the head coach of FK Teplice, before leaving this job due to the worsening disease. In September 2007, he died of leukemia in a Prague hospital.

References

Czechoslovak footballers
Czech football managers
Czech First League managers
FC Fastav Zlín managers
FK Teplice managers
1966 births
2007 deaths
People from Uherské Hradiště
Deaths from cancer in the Czech Republic
Deaths from leukemia
Association footballers not categorized by position
Sportspeople from the Zlín Region